Pro Musica Antiqua is a Polish classical chamber group founded by the flautist Leszek Szarzyński in Olsztyn in 1992. The chamber ensemble specializes in baroque and early classical music of Eastern Europe.

References

Early music groups